Otis Smith (born December 8, 1965) is an American former professional tennis player.

Tennis career
A left-hander from Los Angeles, Smith competed in varsity tennis for the UCLA Bruins and recovered from a badly broken wrist in 1985 to play number one singles for the team. When he finished up at the Bruins in 1987 he joined the international tour and featured regularly on the ATP Challenger Tour. He reached a best singles world ranking of 274 and featured in the qualifying draw for the 1991 Wimbledon Championships.

ATP Challenger finals

Doubles: 4 (0–4)

References

External links
 
 

1965 births
Living people
American male tennis players
UCLA Bruins men's tennis players
Tennis players from Los Angeles